Lake Lumao is a lake located in the Agusan Valley in the province of Agusan del Sur, Philippines. The Agusan River is its main tributary.

Notes

External links
 Top Ten Largest Lakes in the Philippines
Agusan del Sur SocioEconomicBriefHistory

Lumao
Landforms of Agusan del Sur